Lenka Wech (born 9 April 1976 in Falkenau) is a German rower.

External links 
 
 

1976 births
Living people
German female rowers
Rowers at the 2000 Summer Olympics
Rowers at the 2004 Summer Olympics
Rowers at the 2008 Summer Olympics
Olympic rowers of Germany
World Rowing Championships medalists for Germany
People from Sokolov
European Rowing Championships medalists
20th-century German women
21st-century German women